The Nobel Prize is a set of five different prizes that, according to its benefactor Alfred Nobel in his 1895 will, must be awarded "to those who, during the preceding year, have conferred the greatest benefit to humankind”. The five prizes are awarded in the fields of Physics, Chemistry, Physiology or Medicine, Literature, and Peace. 

Since 1901, numerous nominators have forwarded their nominations of distinguished individuals or organizations for the prize, and most of these nominators were women. The following is a list of the female nominators for the prestigious Nobel Prize:

Physics
The Nobel Committee for Physics sends confidential forms to persons who are competent and qualified to nominate. According to the nomination process, the individuals are considered the qualified nominators for the physics prize:

Chemistry
For the chemistry prize, the following individuals are considered as qualified nominators:

Physiology or Medicine
For the physiology or medicine prize, the following individuals are entitled to nominate:

Literature
The Nobel Committee of the Swedish Academy sends invitation letters to persons who are qualified to nominate for the Nobel Prize in Literature. The following individuals are eligible forwarding nominations:

Peace
According to the statutes of the Nobel Foundation, a nomination is considered valid if it is submitted by a person or a group of people who falls within one of the following categories:

References

External links

Nobel
Female
Nobel
Nobel Prize